Steinstossen is the Swiss variant of stone put, a competition in throwing a heavy stone. Practiced among the alpine population since prehistoric times, it is recorded to have taken place in Basel in the 13th century. During the 15th century, it is frequently recorded to have been practiced alongside the Schützenfeste of the Old Swiss Confederacy. It is also central to the Unspunnenfest, first held in 1805, with its symbol the 83.5 kg Unspunnenstein.

Stones used at festivals in Switzerland are of varying sizes and weights, but usually are not much over 50 kg.

Germany
In 1860, Steinstossen was introduced as a track-and-field discipline in Germany, retaining the name in spite of the stone being replaced by a 15 kg block of iron.

United States
Within the United States, the Ohio Swiss Festival in Sugarcreek has the distinction of the longest running competition, having run annually since 1956.   Steinstossen at the Toledo German-American Festival began in 1989. 
The competition is scheduled for a two-hour period beginning at 3:00 pm on Saturday and Sunday at the annual German-American Festival.

Contestants in the Men's division of the Steinstossen hurl a huge stone weighing 138 pounds during two-hour periods beginning at 3:00 on Saturday and Sunday. Contestants begin on a 20-foot runway, hurling the rock into a  sand pit.  The winners at each session win prizes.

The record holder for 21 years was Jud Logan of North Canton, Ohio with a throw of 14 feet 4 inches set at the Sugarcreek event.  That record was broken by Beaux Lenarz in 2005 with a throw of 14 feet 6 inches.  Kevin Marx of Toledo in 2009 had a throw of 15 feet 3½ inches at the German-American Festival - a different rock is used at this festival than is used at the Sugarcreek event so the two cannot be compared, even though both rocks weigh the same.

There is also a women's division of the Steinstossen, using a 75-pound stone.  The women's record at the German-American Festival in 2007 by Becky Ball of Marblehead is 12 feet, 11 inches.

See also
Hornussen
Schwingen

References

Swiss folklore
Individual sports
Sports originating in Switzerland
Throwing sports